Høggøymen is a mountain in Skjåk Municipality in Innlandet county, Norway. The mountain is surrounded by several other notable mountains including Vulueggi to the west, Benkehøa to the north, Sponghøi and Storhøa to the northeast, Dørkampen and Blåhøe to the east, and Stamåhjulet to the southeast.

See also
List of mountains of Norway

References

Skjåk
Mountains of Innlandet